Ptychopseustis undulalis is a moth in the family Crambidae. It is found in India (Bengal).

References

Cybalomiinae
Moths described in 1919